Siva is a 1989 Tamil-language action film directed by Ameerjan. The film stars Rajinikanth, Raghuvaran, Sowcar Janaki and Shobana. It is a remake of the 1977 Hindi film Khoon Pasina. The film was released on 5 May 1989 and became a box-office bomb.

Plot 
The film begins with Siva (Rajinikanth) and  John (Raghuvaran) as kids, they are close friends like their fathers, in spite of their religious differences, one being Hindu and other Christian. A villain kills their families except for Siva, John, and John's mother, but John does not know that Siva and his mother were alive and vice versa. 20 years later, Siva falls in love with Parvathy (Shobana) and marries her. John is a hired goon who will do only good deeds. John is hired by the same villain to kill Siva and during the fight both get injured and finally they come to know that they are childhood friends. Eventually, both of them unite and fight the bad guy who killed their family.

Cast 
 Rajinikanth as Siva (Tiger)
 Raghuvaran as John
 Shobana as Parvathy
 Sowcar Janaki as Siva's mother
 Radha Ravi
 Vinu Chakravarthy
 Janagaraj
 Charle
 Madhuri
 Disco Shanti
 Delhi Ganesh
 Ganeshkar
 Thyagu
 Ilavarasan
 Poornam Viswanathan
 Vijayakumar in a Guest appearance

Soundtrack 
The music composed by Ilaiyaraaja. The song "Iruvizhiyin" is set in Hamsadhvani raga.

Release and reception 
Siva was released on 5 May 1989, and became a box-office bomb. P. S. S. of Kalki gave the film a negative review. The film was dubbed in Telugu as Tiger Siva, released on 19 January 1990.

References

External links 
 

1989 action films
1980s buddy films
1980s masala films
1980s Tamil-language films
1989 films
Films scored by Ilaiyaraaja
Indian action films
Indian buddy films
Tamil remakes of Hindi films